The Rollstuhlbasketball-Bundesliga (RBBL) (Wheelchair basketball federal league) is the first division of Wheelchair basketball in Germany.

Overview 
The RBBL plays with ten teams, which first compete in a main phase with home and away game. The four top ranked teams then enter the playoffs, which are played with semi-finals and a final in a best of three mode. The two teams ranked last are relegated to the northern of southern conference of the 2. Bundesliga (second federal league) depending on their geographic location. The two champions of the 2. Bundesliga conferences are promoted to the RBBL.

Host of the RBBL is the Deutscher Rollstuhlsport-Verband (DRS) (German wheel chair sports association).

History 
The RBBL was founded in 1990 and played with eight teams until 1995. Starting with the season 1995-96, it was extended to ten teams.

Teams 2015-16

Championships

Title holders

Record champions

References

Basketball leagues in Germany
Germany
1990 establishments in Germany
Sports leagues established in 1990